Desantne is a village in Izmail Raion, Odesa Oblast, Ukraine. It belongs to Vylkove urban hromada, one of the hromadas of Ukraine. Population: 1816 

Until 18 July 2020, Desantne belonged to Kiliia Raion. The raion was abolished in July 2020 as part of the administrative reform of Ukraine, which reduced the number of raions of Odesa Oblast to seven. The area of Kiliia Raion was merged into Izmail Raion.

References

Villages in Izmail Raion